Pantheon Macroeconomics is an economic research consultancy founded by Ian Shepherdson.  The firm is located in Newcastle upon Tyne, England, with offices in Valhalla, New York and London.

Description
Founded in 2012, Pantheon Macroeconomics publishes independent economic intelligence to financial market professionals in the form of daily research products, offered by subscription only.

The firm's publications include Daily articles and datanotes on the US, Eurozone, U.K., Asian and Latin American markets. Pantheon Macroeconomics also offers conference calls for its clients and speaking engagements.

The firm's team of economists have been quoted frequently by The New York Times, The Wall Street Journal, The Times, and other media.

History 
Ian Shepherdson founded Pantheon Macroeconomics in 2012, after leaving High Frequency Economics, where he served as Chief US Economist. Ian previously held roles at HSBC as Chief UK Economist and as Chief US economist. Ian was named Wall Street Journal Economic Survey 2014 forecaster of the year for the second time, having previously won the award in 2003.

References

External links
 Official website

Macroeconomics consulting firms